Alexander Khan Setkhanian (1865-1953) was an Iranian general, the Chief of Staff of the Cossack Brigade, a Commander in the Iranian Imperial Army, and a member of the Davidkhanian family.

Early life 
Alexander was born to General Tsatur Khan and Lady Ninon Hovnatanyan. His paternal grandfather was Ambassador Set Khan Astvatsatourian, and his maternal grandfather was Hakob Hovnatanyan. His father chose the Russian general consul in Tabriz, General Stupyn, as Alexander's Godfather.

In 1878, Tsatur Khan kept his promise to Grand Duke Michael Nikolaevich, and sent Alexander to study at the military academy in Tbilisi, Georgia, as he had promised that he would send his son to be educated in the Russian Empire while on a diplomatic mission to the Duke. Before departing, Alexander mastered Persian and Armenian at the Armenian school in Tabriz. In Georgia, he mastered both Russian and French as well, and learned military sciences and Cossack Cavalry tactics. After completing his studies, Alexander travelled to Moscow to finish his higher education. There he became a naturalized citizen of the Russian Empire.

Military career 
After completing his military education in Moscow, Alexander returned to Tabriz in 1887 where he immediately entered the Persian military with the rank of Sarhang. After four years of serving in the military at this rank, Mozaffar al-Din Shah Qajar promoted him to the rank of Sarhang Adjutant in 1892. Alexander then went to Tehran in 1894 to join the Persian Cossack Brigade. By 1900, Alexander had risen to the rank of General of the Brigade, and in 1915, Alexander became Chief of Staff. In 1916, Alexander retired from the Brigade after more than a quarter of a century of service. After his retirement, Reza Khan, who served him under him at the time, was promoted to Sartip and placed in charge of a regiment in Tehran.

Iranian Constitutional Revolution 

Under orders from the Shah, Alexander commanded a division surrounding the Majles. After bombarding parliament, Tehran was placed under martial law by the Brigade. For remaining loyal during the revolution, Alexander was promoted to Amir Tuman, meaning commander of thousands, the highest rank under the Commander of the Brigade. When asked why he participated in the event, one of the most infamous in Iranian history, Alexander responded, "I am a soldier, not a politician; my loyalty is to the Brigade and to the Shah."

The Brigade strongly opposed the subsequent appointment of William Morgan Shuster as Treasurer-General of Persia, who was working with Nationalist forces to forcefully collect taxes on behalf of the Americans, as well as seizing the estates of dissenters. The Brigade intimated Shuster to such an extent that the Majles finally had him dismissed in 1911. The Brigade helped to bring about the downfall of the Majles, effectively ending the era of Constitutional Revolution.

1921 Coup d'état 
After General Edmund Ironside encouraged Reza Khan to stage a coup against the Qajar government in 1921, Alexander was approached by his colleagues to consider opposing Reza Khan. Alexander had been fond of Reza while Reza was a soldier under his command for two years, and had developed a close relationship with him. Reza Khan was often seen around the Davidkhanian mansion during those years. Alexander chose not to oppose his takeover.

As April approached following the coup, Alexander had still not pledged his loyalty to the new Shah. Alexander invited him to the Davidkhanian family mansion on Khiaban-e Sepah, where he had Cossacks guarding him and his family. On Reza Khan's orders, he and Alexander were let alone to discuss the future in private. The two walked the garden of the estate, and began to circumnavigate the pond. Halfway around the pond, Alexander stopped walking, and Reza Khan put his arm around the older general's shoulder, and continued to walk. Five years later, Reza Khan crowned himself king of Iran, establishing the Pahlavi dynasty.

Personal life 

In 1894, Alexander married Maryam Davidkhanian, the daughter of another General, Martiros Khan Davidkhanian, becoming a member of the Davidkhanian family by marriage. In his retirement, Alexander maintained the Hammam-e Amir that Martiros Khan Davidkhanian had erected behind the Davidkhanian mansion for the Armenians of Iran, as well as took part in hunting, fishing, and fine woodworking. During this period, Alexander also spent time at the Soviet embassy in Tehran since diplomatic relations had been restored in 1920, maintaining friendships with the Ambassador and other members of the Soviet diplomatic mission.

Death 
Alexander died in 1953. Following his death, a vast crowd of mourners crowded Tehran’s Armenian church to pay respects to him. Among the mourners were numerous government officials and military officers representing the Pahlavi regime. A military spokesman reportedly apologized to the family for the small number of officials in attendance, explaining that the current political turmoil in the wake of the CIA-engineered coup d’état made their attendance difficult.

Following the service, government officials and military officers gathered outside to praise the virtues of a man who had served his country under four Qajar Shahs, and whose family had served the country for more than a century. The homage paid to the retired general was a reflection of the high esteem in which he was held for a lifetime of service to the country, during which he had directly participated in significant events that had paved the way for the governing regime.

His casket was covered in the Iranian flag and carried on the shoulders of a military honor guard. The streets leading to the cemetery were lined with hundreds of uniformed soldiers.

References 

Iranian generals
Qajar civil servants
1865 births
1953 deaths
19th-century Iranian military personnel
20th-century Iranian military personnel
Iranian people of Armenian descent